"'Blah Blah Blah" is a song by South Korean girl group Itzy. It is the group's second Japanese maxi single. The song was released by Warner Music Japan on October 5, 2022.

Composition 
The release contains four tracks, including the title song "Blah Blah Blah" and the B-side "Can't tie me down" with the instrumental versions of the songs. The single "Blah Blah Blah" features a rhythmic rap and an "addictive" synth melody. Lyrically, it is about "moving forward confidently without being swayed by other people's words". "Blah Blah Blah" was composed in the key of E♭ Minor, with a tempo of 116 beats per minute.

Promotion 
On August 5, JYP Entertainment announced through their Japanese website that Itzy will hold their first offline special event in Japan exclusively for "Itzy Japan Official Shop!". To communicate with fans. To promote "Blah Blah Blah", Itzy performed the song on the Japanese television show Music Station.

Track listing

Charts

Weekly charts

Year-end charts

Release history

References

2022 singles
Itzy songs
2022 songs
Song articles with missing songwriters